1064 Aethusa, provisional designation , is a stony background asteroid from the central regions of the asteroid belt, approximately 19 kilometers in diameter. It was discovered on 2 August 1926, by astronomer Karl Reinmuth at the Heidelberg-Königstuhl State Observatory in southwest Germany. The asteroid was named after the plant Aethusa cynapium (fool's parsley).

Orbit and classification 

Aethusa is a background asteroid with no associated asteroid family. It orbits the Sun in the central main belt at a distance of 2.1–3.0 AU once every 4 years and 1 month (1,481 days). Its orbit has an eccentricity of 0.18 and an inclination of 10° with respect to the ecliptic. The observation arc begins at Heidelberg/Simeiz Observatory two nights after the asteroid's official discovery observation.

Physical characteristics 

Aethusa is an assumed stony S-type asteroid, the most common type in the inner part of the central asteroid belt.

Rotation period 

In November 2004, a rotational lightcurve of Aethusa was obtained from photometric observations by French amateur astronomer René Roy at Blauvac Observatory. Lightcurve analysis gave a rotation period of 12.916 hours with a brightness variation of 0.12 magnitude, while in March 2006, astronomer Brian Warner at his Palmer Divide observatory in Colorado, United States, obtained a shorter period of 8.621 hours and an amplitude of 0.18 magnitude.

Diameter and albedo 

According to the surveys carried out by the Infrared Astronomical Satellite IRAS, the Japanese Akari satellite, the MIPS photometer on the Spitzer Space Telescope, and the NEOWISE mission of NASA's Wide-field Infrared Survey Explorer, Aethusa measures between 17.42 and 25.361 kilometers in diameter  and its surface has an albedo between 0.160 and 0.3202.

The Collaborative Asteroid Lightcurve Link derives a high albedo of 0.2952 and a diameter of 18.56 kilometers based on an absolute magnitude of 10.6.

Naming 

This minor planet was named after the genus "Aethusa" in the carrot family, of which the plant Aethusa cynapium – commonly known as fool's parsley, fool's cicely, or poison parsley – is the only member. The official naming citation was mentioned in The Names of the Minor Planets by Paul Herget in 1955.

See also

Notes

References

External links 
 Asteroid Lightcurve Database (LCDB), query form (info )
 Dictionary of Minor Planet Names, Google books
 Asteroids and comets rotation curves, CdR – Observatoire de Genève, Raoul Behrend
 Discovery Circumstances: Numbered Minor Planets (1)-(5000) – Minor Planet Center
 
 

001064
Discoveries by Karl Wilhelm Reinmuth
Named minor planets
19260802